Northumberland Road is a Victorian street in Ballsbridge, Dublin, the capital of the Republic of Ireland.

The street was named after Hugh Percy, 3rd Duke of Northumberland in 1844, and built on the site of the earlier Blenheim Street. The property on both sides of the road was developed into residential houses at the turn of the 20th century by Reginald Herbert, 15th Earl of Pembroke.

What is considered to be one of the biggest battles of the Easter Uprising occurred at 25 Northumberland Road. According to The Irish Times, at 4:45PM on Day One, "The elderly, unarmed Veteran Defence Force march into a rebel ambush on Northumberland Road".

References

Streets in Dublin (city)